Gents may refer to:

 washroom, toilet, loo, bathroom, little boys room
 Gents (novel), a 1997 novel by Warwick Collins
 The Gents (American band), led by Willie Kent
 The Gents (British band), from Doncaster, a mod revival band
 The Gents (Dutch vocal group), a classical music ensemble led by Peter Dijkstra
 The Gents (British jazz band), from Swansea, with member Steve Augarde
 The Gents (Bermuda rock band), a rock band active in the 1960s

See also

 Gent (disambiguation)
 Gentleman (disambiguation)
 Gentlewoman (disambiguation)
 
 Lady (disambiguation)